The Calico Dragon is a 1935 Happy Harmonies cartoon short directed by Rudolf Ising for the Metro-Goldwyn-Mayer cartoon studio.  Even though the start and end dates for certain scenes are incomplete, the cartoon was produced relatively quickly, with confirmed dates on the animation being done from January 17 to February 14, 1935 and the cartoon first being released on March 30, 1935.

Plot

When a little girl falls asleep after reading a fairy tale to her doll, her toys come to life. The toys act out a fairy tale in which a prince has to fight a dragon.

Crew Members
 Musical Direction by Scott Bradley
 Animation by Jim "Tony" Pabian, Pete Burness, Cal Dalton and Bob Allen
 Additional Animation by Bob Stokes, Tom McKimson, Carl Urbano, Gil Turner, Frankie "Franshaw" Smith and Joe D'Igalo
 The Scott Bradley Chorus sings "I'm the Calico Dragon"

Awards
The cartoon was nominated for the Academy Award for Best Animated Short Film in 1935.

References

External links
 

Metro-Goldwyn-Mayer animated short films
1935 films
1935 animated films
1935 short films
1930s American animated films
1930s animated short films
Films directed by Rudolf Ising
Happy Harmonies
Films about sentient toys
Films about princes
Animated films about dragons